A gateleg table is a type of furniture first introduced in England in the 16th century. The table top has a fixed section and one or two hinged leaves, which, when not in use, fold down below the fixed section to hang vertically.

As such, gateleg tables are a subset of the type known as a dropleaf. The hinged section, or flap, was supported on pivoted legs joined at the top and bottom by stretchers constituting a gate. Large flaps had two supports, which had the advantage of providing freer leg space in the centre. The earliest gateleg tables of the 16th and 17th century were typically made of oak.

See also
English furniture
Knole Settee

References

External links 

Tables (furniture)
History of furniture
16th century in England
English furniture